The Coastal Carolina Chanticleers football team represents Coastal Carolina University in college football. The team competes in the East Division of the Sun Belt Conference as part of the NCAA Division I Football Bowl Subdivision. The program has had three head coaches since it began play during the 2003 season. Since the start of the 2019 season, Jamey Chadwell has served as head coach of the Chanticleers. Since December 2022, Tim Beck has served as head coach of the Chanticleers.

As of the conclusion of the 2022 season, the team has played 242 games over 20 seasons. In that time, three coaches have led the Chanticleers in postseason play: David Bennett, Joe Moglia, and Jamey Chadwell. As a member of the FBS, Coastal Carolina made appearances in three bowl game, and also made six appearances in the FCS Playoffs as a member of that division, playing in ten games for an overall postseason record of 5–8. The Chanticleers have won two conference championships and four shared conference championships as a member of the Big South Conference and one as a member of the Sun Belt Conference.

David Bennett was the program's inaugural head coach, and led the program for its first nine years before his dismissal on December 10, 2011. Former TD Ameritrade CEO Joe Moglia was hired as his replacement. The move to hire Moglia was criticized by some as Moglia was struggling through a season as the head coach of the Omaha Nighthawks at the time, and, before his two-year stint as an volunteer assistant coach at Nebraska from 2009–2010, he had not held a coaching position since serving as Dartmouth's defensive coordinator in 1983. On July 28, 2017, Moglia announced that he would take a five month "medical sabbatical" to address a bronchial asthmatic reaction that was causing inflammation in his lungs. He appointed offensive coordinator Jamey Chadwell to lead the program for the 2017 season, and after returning for the 2018 season, Moglia stepped down to serve as the chair of athletics for the program. Chadwell was promoted to head coach on January 18, 2019.

Key

Coaches

Notes

References

Coastal Carolina

South Carolina sports-related lists